Tomas is a French and a Croatian surname.

It may refer to:

 Julien Tomas (born 1985), French rugby union footballer
 Marko Tomas (born 1985), Croatian basketball player
 Stjepan Tomas (born 1976), Bosnian-born Croatian football player
 Xavier Tomas (born 1986), French football player

See also
 Tomaš (surname)

French-language surnames
Croatian surnames
Surnames from given names